The Chemical Institute of Canada Medal or CIC Medal is the highest award that the Chemical Institute of Canada confers. Awarded annually since 1951, it is given to "a person who has made an outstanding contribution to the science of chemistry or chemical engineering in Canada".

The medal is presented at the annual Canadian Chemistry Conference and Exhibition or Canadian Chemical Engineering Conference, at which the recipient gives a plenary lecture.

The award commemorates the isolation of nickel by Frederik Cronstedt in 1751. The medals were originally sponsored by the International Nickel Company and consisted of 8 ounces (227g) of pure palladium. The sponsorship ended in 2006, since when the medals have been made of silver plated nickel.

Winners
Source (recent winners): CIC

See also

 List of chemistry awards

References

Chemistry awards
Canadian science and technology awards